The Mechanics of Yenagoa is a 2020 novel by Nigerian-Canadian writer Michael Afenfia.

Plot
The Mechanics of Yenagoa is about Ebinimi a Mechanic in Yenagoa. It explores the dynamics between working-class people and the day-to-day activities of the people of Yenagoa.

Awards and recognition
Top 11 Books to expect in 2020 by Daily Trust.
 Among the notable books of 2020 by YNaija.

References

2020 Canadian novels
2020 Nigerian novels
Black Canadian literature